Sidney LeRoi Clunis (22 April 1911 – 7 November 1975) was a Liberal party member of the House of Commons of Canada. Born in Blenheim, Ontario, he was a lawyer by career.

He attended public and secondary schools in Blenheim, then Ontario Agricultural College and the University of Western Ontario and Osgoode Hall Law School. He attained a Bachelor of Arts degree.

He was first elected at the Kent riding in the 1962 general election, defeating incumbent Harold Danforth of the Progressive Conservative party. After serving one term, the 25th Parliament, he was defeated by Danforth in the 1963 election.

References

External links
 

1911 births
1975 deaths
Members of the House of Commons of Canada from Ontario
Liberal Party of Canada MPs
Lawyers in Ontario
People from Chatham-Kent
University of Western Ontario alumni
Osgoode Hall Law School alumni